WSEZ is an AM radio station broadcasting on the assigned frequency of 1560 kHz; 1560 AM is United States clear-channel frequency, on which KNZR is the dominant Class A station.

WSEZ broadcasts an Oldies format and is owned by Diamond Shores Broadcasting, LLC.

References

External links

SEZ